Frank L. Engle (June 9, 1916 - February 20, 2002) was an American artist and educator from Alabama. A professor of Art at the University of Alabama, he was an oil and watercolor painter, a ceramic and metal sculptor, a printmaker, and a glass artist. He designed the crest of the 1949 Ford. Along with his wife, he was the subject of a retrospective at the Dinah Washington Cultural Arts Center on the campus of the University of Alabama in 2017.

References

1916 births
2002 deaths
People from Peoria County, Illinois
Herron School of Art and Design alumni
American male painters
American glass artists
Painters from Alabama
Sculptors from Alabama
University of Alabama faculty
20th-century American painters
20th-century American sculptors
20th-century American male artists